SS Milwaukee Clipper, also known as SS Clipper , and formerly as SS Juniata, is a retired passenger ship and automobile ferry that sailed under two configurations and traveled on all of the Great Lakes except Lake Ontario. The vessel is now docked in Muskegon, Michigan.

Juniata

The Milwaukee Clipper was launched on December 22, 1904, in Cleveland, Ohio, at the shipyards of the American Shipbuilding Company. Christened Juniata when she was launched, she was built for the Anchor Line, the Great Lakes marine division of the Pennsylvania Railroad.  Her sister ships are the SS Tionesta of 1902 and SS Octorara of 1910.

She carried 350 passengers in staterooms at 18 knots. As originally built, she had a riveted steel hull and a wooden superstructure. For the Pennsylvania Railroad, she carried passengers and freight between Buffalo, New York and Duluth, Minnesota until 1915.

That year, the anti-monopoly Panama Canal Act, which forbade railroads from owning steamships, went into effect. Forced to divest from its marine divisions, the Pennsylvania Railroad sold its Anchor Line along with four other railroad-owned company fleets, to the newly formed Great Lakes Transit Corporation.  Under this flag, she carried passengers along her old routes for another 20 seasons. For the duration of the 1933 season, Juniata carried passengers to and from Chicago for the Chicago World's Fair. Juniata was laid up in 1936 due to poor economic conditions as well as new regulations on wooden passenger ships following the Morro Castle disaster.

Milwaukee Clipper
Juniata was moored in Buffalo until being sold in 1940 to Wisconsin & Michigan Steamship Company, a subsidiary of the McKee family-owned Sand Products Corporation of Detroit, MI. She was rebuilt and used as a passenger ship on Lake Michigan. Juniata was extensively modernized at the yard of the Manitowoc Shipbuilding Company.  Her boilers were converted to burn fuel oil instead of coal, and the old cabins and wooden superstructure were removed and replaced with steel to meet the new maritime fire safety standards created after the SS Morro Castle fire off Asbury Park, New Jersey in 1934. The streamlined forward stack is false and does not ventilate engine exhaust. It is a signature of naval architect George Sharp, whose ideas regarding fireproof ships were first incorporated into Juniata.  This stack became standard on many new ships that were to come. Sharp is credited with three historic vessels, Milwaukee Clipper,  SS Lane Victory, and NS Savannah.  

The modernized ship now featured air conditioned staterooms, a children's playroom, a movie theater, a dance floor with a live band, a soda fountain, bar, cafeteria, lounges and sports deck, and capacity to carry 120 automobiles. She was christened Milwaukee Clipper on June 2, 1941, by Patricia McKee, daughter of Max B. McKee, principal of Sand Products Corporation, owner of the vessel. She made her maiden voyage from Milwaukee to Muskegon the following day. As Milwaukee Clipper, she steamed between Muskegon and Milwaukee, as well as excursions throughout Lake Michigan visiting various other ports, for 29 seasons. She was also called the "Queen of the Great Lakes" and carried around 900 passengers and 120 automobiles in the summer. On week days she made two round trips that took 7 hours each way, using three of the four boilers. On weekends, she made three, six-hour round trips on all four boilers. The crew lists were between 105 and 109, with around 55 of them in the steward's department alone to take care of the around 900 passengers on board. 
The cost per person in the 1950s was $3.33 and $8.00 extra for an automobile, with an extra 75 cents charged to travel in the forward Club Lounge and to use the forward deck.

During World War II, Milwaukee Clipper transported defense materials between Muskegon and Milwaukee. The ship had contracts with auto manufacturers to carry new cars during her entire career. The passenger season was between May and September. After that she was under various limited passenger certificates which allowed her to carry a reduced number of passengers and up to 250 automobiles.

By 1970, the company had plans to replace Milwaukee Clipper with the newer and larger Aquarama.  Negotiations regarding dredging the Milwaukee harbor for Aquarama failed and the plan did not materialize.  Ironically, though 1970 was a banner year for Milwaukee Clipper, she stopped running her regular route after that year.

Museum ship
In 1977, Milwaukee Clipper was purchased by Chicago interests headed by James Gillon, operating out of Navy Pier. They planned to put her on a Chicago to Milwaukee run made popular by the whaleback passenger ship SS Christopher Columbus. Unfortunately, after being towed to Bay Shipbuilding for inspection, financial backing fell through and Milwaukee Clipper was seized by the U.S. Marshal. After several court cases, the vessel was returned to Gillon, being towed to Chicago in 1980 for use as a museum ship on Navy Pier.

In December 1983, Milwaukee Clipper was listed on the National Register of Historic Places, and in May 1989 the ship was designated a National Historic Landmark. Today, both plaques are on board the ship. The next year (1990), she was sold to Hammond, Indiana where she served as the centerpiece for their large new marina.  After Milwaukee Clipper was replaced by a new casino ship, she was towed to South Chicago and laid up on the Calumet River. She was sold on December 2, 1997 for use as a museum in Muskegon, Michigan, her old home port.

Milwaukee Clipper is currently docked in Muskegon, Michigan at the old Grand Trunk Ferry dock, undergoing restoration by volunteers of the SS Milwaukee Clipper Preservation, Inc. organization. In the summer season, visitors tour the pilothouse, some staterooms, crew quarters, dance floor, soda bowl, movie theater and more.  A large collection of the original Art Deco furniture remains on board. Warren McArthur was the designer and builder of the ship furniture.  The frames were all aluminum.  He designed furniture for buildings, such as theaters, and there were no two that were alike. A piece of Milwaukee Clipper furniture off the ship is readily identifiable. There are also displays of memorabilia from both Juniata and Milwaukee Clipper, which include memory books, photographs, brochures, dishes and other items of interest. The Clipper retains the last American Quadruple Expansion Steam Engine.

Media and legacy
A 45-minute documentary, The Milwaukee Clipper: A Legend Saved, was produced by filmmaker Mark Howell in 1997 and shown on PBS. The program has interviews with the key people who worked aboard the ship and includes restored 16 mm color film footage of Milwaukee Clippers christening, sailing, and other operations.

See also

Lake Express, service along the same route since 2004
U.S. Route 16, the route broken by Lake Michigan whose gap the Milwaukee Clipper bridged
SS Keewatin
SS Badger

References

External links
SS Milwaukee Clipper website
HNSA Ship Page: SS Milwaukee Clipper
Lost Milwaukee: The History of the Milwaukee Clipper

Passenger ships of the Great Lakes
Merchant ships of the United States
National Historic Landmarks in Michigan
Ships on the National Register of Historic Places in Michigan
Museum ships in Michigan
Museums in Muskegon County, Michigan
Passenger ships of the United States
1904 ships
Buildings and structures in Muskegon, Michigan
U.S. Route 16
National Register of Historic Places in Muskegon County, Michigan
Milwaukee Clipper
Ships built in Cleveland